Fr Timothy Edward (Ted) McGrath (1881–1977), was an Australian Catholic priest and with Eileen O'Connor the founder of Our Lady's Nurses for the Poor.

Early life
McGrath was born in Bungeet near Benalla, North East Victoria in 1881 to a poor rural family of Irish descent. Both his parents died by the time he was seven and his education was severely limited. Despite this background he was accepted into the order of the Missionaries of the Sacred Heart and ordained a priest by Cardinal Moran in 1909. He was appointed the first priest in charge of the new parish of Coogee in Sydney's eastern suburbs.

Work with Eileen O'Connor
He met a young woman Eileen O'Connor, who was severely physically disabled by spinal problems, and was deeply impressed with her holiness. Together they determined to found a group of religious women who would care for the sick poor in their own homes. On 15 April 1913 in Coogee the pair co-founded Our Lady's Nurses for the Poor. McGrath acted as chaplain and organiser since at this time Eileen could not walk.

Following allegations of scandal, McGrath's superiors at the Sacred Heart Monastery, Kensington, ordered him to break off contact with O'Connor. He refused and was expelled from the order. He and O'Connor travelled to Rome in 1915 to appeal the decision. He was readmitted to the order but forbidden to return to Australia.

Despite these difficulties the order was firmly established by the time of O'Connor's death in 1921.

Later life

He served as a chaplain with the British Army on the Western Front in 1918. On Sept 28 near Wailly-Beaucamp in northern France, he went forward under heavy fire to rescue a wounded officer in no-man's-land. He was awarded a Military Cross.

After serving in Wichita and elsewhere in the US and Europe, he was finally allowed by his superiors to return to Australia in 1941. In 1969 he retired to Our Lady's Home in Coogee and died there in 1977, aged 95.

Bibliography

References

1881 births
1977 deaths
20th-century Australian Roman Catholic priests
Missionaries of the Sacred Heart
Founders of Catholic religious communities